Sar Cheshmeh (also Romanized as Sar Chashmeh) is a village in Anarestan Rural District of Riz District, Jam County, Bushehr province, Iran. At the 2006 census, its population was 326 in 71 households. The following census in 2011 counted 306 people in 75 households. The latest census in 2016 showed a population of 407 people in 118 households; it was the largest village in its rural district.

References 

Populated places in Jam County